Doncho Donchev (born 1974) is a Bulgarian artist and illustrator.

Biography and work 
Doncho Donchev was born on 22 August 1974 in Gabrovo, in the family of teachers. He graduated the secondary Art School in Tryavna (1993) and completed Master's studies in St. Cyril and St. Methodius University of Veliko Turnovo (2000), in the programme Painting with Prof. Nikolay Ruschukliev.

He works with a variety of materials, holds one-man exhibitions, illustrates books and participates in music projects, drawing before an audience on stage. His childhood passed in Dryanovo, where he had his first exhibitions in Dryanovo Art Gallery, the Development cultural club and the Old School in Tryavna, as early as when he was a student. Since 1997 he has been exhibiting his works in various cities and countries and organizing a great number of one-man exhibitions.

Since 2000 he has been working in his studio in Sofia. He travels in Europe to present his projects. His works have been exhibited in Zurich, Bern, Locarno, Geneva, Liechtenstein, Stuttgart, Leipzig, Minden, Vienna, Milan, Brussels, Maastricht, Barcelona, Bratislava, Istanbul, Izmir, Jacobstad (Pietarsaari), Sofia, Plovdiv, Varna, Gabrovo, etc.

Presentations 
 "Particle Metamorphoses" CERN, Geneva 2016
 Milan – Expo 2015, pavilion "Corriere della Sera" (Riflessioni) curator Arminio Sciolli
 Sofia – Bulgaria hall, Sofia philharmonic (Metamorphoses) 2015
 Vaduz, Liechtenstein National Museum (Logos-Mythos) 2015
 Zurich, Petra Lossen Gallery (Logos-Mythos) 2014
 Sofia, Arena di Serdica (Playing Cards) 2013
 Istanbul, Gallery Ziraat Bank, 2011
 Izmir, Gallery "Akademist" (The Reincarnation of the Satir) 2007

Exhibitions And live performances 
 2014 – Sofia Live Club – The Golden Project (Seventh Sense)
 2014 – Ruse, Dohodno Zdanie – The Golden Project (Seventh Sense)
 2014 – Varna, Boris Georgiev City Art Gallery – The Golden Project (Seventh Sense)
 2015 – Plovdiv, Chamber Scene Plovdiv – The Golden Project (Seventh Sense)
 2015 – Dobrich, Hall of Mirrors – The Golden Project (Seventh Sense)
 2015 – Sofia, Bulgaria hall, Sofia philharmonic (Metamorphoses) – 2015
 2015 – Minden, Germany  – Fort A, The Golden Project & Anton Syarov
 2015 – Balchik, Balchik Palace – The Golden Project (Seventh Sense)
 2015 – Minden, Marienkirche – (Nocturne in Blue), musical compositions Anton Sjarov

Illustrations 
 2015 – "Nocturne in Blue" by Anton Syarov– cover and illustrations 
 2014 – "Seventh Sense", "The Golden Project", cover and illustrations 
 2012 – Heavy Metal magazine – text Kerim Sakizli, publishing house "Arkabahce", Istanbul
 2007 – "Fatemate" – graphic novel, text Kerim Sakizli, publishing house "Arkabahce", Istanbul
 2007 – Poems in Paintings – poetry, text Kerim Sakizli, publishing house "Arkabahce", Istanbul
 2007 – "The Reincarnation of the Satir" poetry, text Kerim Sakizli, publishing house "Arkabahce", Istanbul

Projects and participations 
 "Particle Metamorphoses" CERN, Geneva
 "Riflessioni" submitted: Expo 2015, pavilion newspaper "Corriere della Sera" curator Arminio Sciolli ; Arte in dirreta, Locarno, LDV Gallery
 "Logos Mithos" submitted: Vaduz, Liechtenstein National Museum; Zurich – Petra Lossen Gallery
 "Graphic Stage" Vienna, Viva Art Gallery
 "Metamorphoses" Sofia – Bulgaria hall
 "Playing Cards" Sofia, Arena di Serdica; Plovdiv, Vinaria; Maasricht, CHICHO foundation

Sources 
 Doncho Donchev 
 Metamorphoses Of Doncho Donchev, www.stand.bg
 Sofia philharmonic
 Liechtenstein Exhibition, destinationdryanovo.com
 The Golden Project and Doncho Donchev, dariknews.bg
 Bulgarian wikipedia article
 
 

1974 births
Living people
Bulgarian artists
Bulgarian illustrators